
Year 398 (CCCXCVIII) was a common year starting on Friday (link will display the full calendar) of the Julian calendar, the 395th Year of the Common Era (CE) and Anno Domini (AD) designations, the 398th year of the 1st millennium, the last 3 years of the 4th century, and the 9th and pre-final year of the 390s decade. At the time, it was known as the Year of the Consulship of Augustus and Eutychianus (or, less frequently, year 1151 Ab urbe condita). The denomination 398 for this year has been used since the early medieval period, when the Anno Domini calendar era became the prevalent method in Europe for naming years.

Events 
 By place 

 Roman Empire 
 Gildonic Revolt: Gildo, a Berber serving as a high-ranking official (comes) in Mauretania, rebels against the Western Roman Empire. The Gildonic Revolt is instigated by a powerful official in the Eastern Roman Empire named Eutropius, who wishes to undermine his enemies in the Western Roman Empire by cutting off the grain supply to Rome. After Gildo takes much of North Africa and cuts off the grain supply to Rome, Flavius Stilicho returns to Italy to raise troops against the rebels. After a short campaign in the desert, he defeats Gildo. Gildo flees and commits suicide by hanging himself.
 Eutropius, Roman general (magister militum), celebrates his victory over the Huns ("the wolves of the North") in a parade through Constantinople (see 395). 
 An imperial edict obliges Roman landowners with plantations to yield 1/3 of their fields to the "barbarians" who have been settled in the Roman Empire.
 Emperor Honorius marries Stilicho's daughter Maria.
 Possible date for the Second Pictish War.

 By topic 

 Religion 
 John Chrysostom, Archbishop of Constantinople, receives a delegation of clergy who want to close the pagan temples at Gaza (Palestine) where worshipers are openly defying the law. John works through the eunuch Eutropius, who has great power over emperor Arcadius, and within a week an imperial Constitution is issued closing the Roman temples, but the official appointed to execute this order is bribed.
 Augustine of Hippo completes his Confessions, an autobiography that recounts his intellectual and spiritual development.

Births 
 Fan Ye, Chinese historian (d. 445)

Deaths 
 May 27 – Murong Bao, emperor of the Xianbei state Later Yan (b. 355)
 August 15 – Lan Han, official of the Xianbei state Lan Yan
 Didymus the Blind, Alexandrian theologian
 Gildo, Moorish prince and comes Africae (governor)
 Murong Lin, Chinese prince of the Xianbei state Later Yan
 Murong Nong, Chinese prince of the Xianbei state Later Yan
 Nectarius, archbishop of Constantinople

References